The 1987 All-Ireland Senior Football Championship was the 101st staging of the All-Ireland Senior Football Championship, the Gaelic Athletic Association's premier inter-county Gaelic football tournament. The championship began on 17 May 1987 and ended on 20 September 1987.

Kerry entered the championship as the defending champions, however, they were defeated by Cork in a Munster final replay.

On 20 September 1987, Meath won the championship following a 1–14 to 0–11 defeat of Cork in the All-Ireland final. This was their 4th All-Ireland title, their first since 1967.

Cork's Larry Tompkins was the championship's top scorer with 0-38. Meath's Brian Stafford was the choice for Texaco Footballer of the Year.

Results

Connacht Senior Football Championship

Quarter-finals

Semi-finals

Final

Leinster Senior Football Championship

Preliminary round

Quarter-finals

 

Semi-finals

Final

Munster Senior Football Championship

Quarter-finals

Semi-finals

Finals

Ulster Senior Football Championship

Preliminary round

Quarter-finals

Semi-finals

Final

All-Ireland Senior Football Championship

Semi-finals

Final

Championship statistics

Top scorers

Overall

Single game

Miscellaneous

 On 17 May 1987, Páirc na nGael, Askeaton hosted its first championship game for 17 years the Munster football Quarter-Final game between Tippearay vs Limerick.
 Waterford beat Clare for the first time since 1958 after a Replay.
 Derry win the Ulster Championship for the first time since 1976.
 The All-Ireland semi-final between Meath and Derry was the very first championship meeting of the two sides.
 The All-Ireland final saw Meath qualify for the decider for the first time since 1970, while Cork were appearing in the showpiece for the first time since 1973. It was their second ever championship meeting and their first since 1967.

References